General Bower may refer to:

Hamilton Bower (1858–1940), British Indian Army major general
Roger Bower (1903–1990), British Army lieutenant general

See also
Verne L. Bowers (1919–2020), U.S. Army major general